Greenwood High School (often referred to as GHS) is a 4-year high school in Bowling Green, Kentucky, United States.  It is one of four high schools serving Warren County Public Schools.

History 
Greenwood High School was opened in 1990.

Athletics

Baseball 
14th District Champions 1998, 1999, 2005, 2008, 2013
14th District Runner-up 1996, 1997, 2002, 2004, 2006 
4th Region Champions 2002  
4th Region Runner-up 1996, 1999, 2004, 2005, 2008

Basketball 
2007-2008 Season- The '07-'08 boys' basketball team was very successful with an overall record of 24-11 and a Region 4 Championship at Diddle Arena to earn a trip to the Boys' Sweet Sixteen at Rupp Arena in Lexington, Kentucky.  The region games were (in order), GHS vs. Franklin-Simpson High School (46-31), GHS vs. Barren County (67-65), GHS vs. Bowling Green High School (57-49).  This was the team's second appearance at Rupp Arena; they lost to Paducah Tilghman High School (53-77).
1994-1995 Season - The team, led by 1996 KY Mr. Basketball Daymeon Fishback, Jason Lathrem, Kevin Terry & Matt Lyons, won the school's first regional championship & first appearance at the KHSAA Sweet 16 Tournament at Rupp Arena but lost to Louisville St. Xavier. The team was coached by the late Larry Cheatham & assisted by Jonathan McDaniel, Jason Couch, & Todd Tolbert.

Football 
1999- Set a school record for wins in a season with a 7-4 overall record. Hosted school's first ever home playoff game.
2007- This tied Greenwood Football's previous most successful season with an overall record of 5-6 and a district record of 3-2 which led to the football team's first District 2 Championship win.
2008- The Gator football team matched a school record for wins en route to a 7-5 record, posting a district record of 3-1, good enough for a second consecutive 5A District 2 title.  The Gators also won their first playoff game in school history, 27-13 over Louisville Butler.
2009- The Gator football team has set several school records this year with the first ever 3rd and 4th round playoff game, most wins with 10 in a season in a 10-3 season so far. The Gators also set a record for first ever undefeated District title at 4-0 en route to 3 consecutive 5A District 2 title. Also a school record of 6-0 versus class 5A teams.

Softball 
The Lady Gator Softball team has been a very solid program since the school opened, with 11 District 14 championships, 8 Region 4 championships, one time State Runner-up, and back-to-back State Championships.  They are the second team in Kentucky's high school softball history to receive back-to-back State Championships.  
1997- State Runner-Ups
2003- 3rd place at State
2006- 5th place at State
2007- State Champions
2008- State Champions
2013- State Champions 44-0

Volleyball 
Won 7 region titles in 11 years. 
2002, 2004–2007, 2009, 2010 under the direction of Holly and Alan Whittinghill.
Made state Semi-finals in 2006.
Ranked as high as 7th in the state in 2009. 6th in 2010
nine straight district titles.

Soccer 
Men- 11 time 8th District Champions, 6 time Region 4 Champions, 2 time Sectional Champions, final four appearance, and two time State Runner-Ups(2004 & 2009).
Women- 8 time 8th District Champions, 5 time Region 4 Champions, 5 time Sub-Sectional Champions, 5 time Sectional Champs, 5 State Final Four appearances, and 1 State Championship Title.

Cross country 
Greenwood's Cross Country program is also very successful. Michael Eaton was the state champion in 2004 and 2005 and was Mr. Kentucky and named Gatorade runner of the year. His younger brother Ryan was the 2008 and 2009 state champion and also named Mr. Kentucky and Gatorade runner of the year.

Other sports 
Tennis. Boys have won 3 straight 4th region titles, 2013, 2014, 2015. Beck Pennington 2011 singles state champion.
Golf
Swimming & Diving
Cheerleading
Dance Team
Lacrosse
Academic Team
Future Problem Solving (FPS) Team.
Bowling

Greenwood High School Marching Band
The Greenwood High School Marching Band has been competing since 1990 and has made four State Finals appearances.  Year to year they have been successful in their regular season performances and quarterfinal performances. The marching band also serves as a pep band for the football team, performs at halftime during football games, represents Greenwood in community parades, has competed nationally at Bands of America, and represented Kentucky in the World War II Memorial Dedication in Washington, D.C. (2004)

Notable alumni
Corey Hart - Milwaukee Brewers Outfielder
Cage The Elephant - band
Daymeon Fishback - former Auburn Tigers basketball player and current sports analyst

References

External links
 
 Gator Baseball
 home page
 publicschoolreview.com

Schools in Warren County, Kentucky
Public high schools in Kentucky
Buildings and structures in Bowling Green, Kentucky